Pros vs. Joes was an American physical reality game show that aired on Spike from 2006 to 2010.  The show featured male amateur contestants (the "Joes") matching themselves against professional athletes (the "Pros"; mostly of retired male and female pro-athletes) in a series of athletic feats related to the expertise sport of the Pro they are facing.  For its first three seasons, the show was hosted by Petros Papadakis. In the last two seasons, it was co-hosted by Michael Strahan and Jay Glazer. The first two seasons were filmed at Carson, California's Home Depot Center, which was referenced in aerial shots. Repeats can currently be seen on the El Rey Network.

Professional participants

Season One
Each of the first nine episodes of Pros vs. Joes consisted of a team of five professional athletes, distinguished by their uniform color on the show. Each team, other than the Red Team, appeared in two episodes. A special, "all-star", six-member Orange Team was put together for the season finale.

Red Team
Bill Goldberg, NFL / WCW / WWE
Matt Williams, MLB
Dennis Rodman, NBA
Jim McMahon, NFL
Jerry Rice, NFL

Blue Team
Muggsy Bogues, NBA
Jennie Finch, Softball
Bo Jackson, NFL / MLB
Dan O'Brien, Olympic Decathlon
Bill Romanowski, NFL

Yellow Team
Kevin Greene, NFL
Alexi Lalas, MLS
Misty May, Volleyball
Xavier McDaniel, NBA
Dave Stewart, MLB

Green Team
Morten Andersen, NFL
Clyde Drexler, NBA
Gary Hall Jr., Olympic Swimming
Rebecca Lobo, WNBA
John Rocker, MLB

Purple Team
Brandi Chastain, Soccer / WUSA / WPS
Darren Daulton, MLB
Justin Gatlin, Track
Herschel Walker, NFL / USFL
Dominique Wilkins, NBA

Orange "All-Star" Team

Winner: Charlie Brenneman

Xavier McDaniel & Clyde Drexler, Basketball
John Rocker & Darren Daulton, Baseball
Bill Goldberg & Kevin Greene, Football

Season Two
Each of the second-season episodes of Pros vs. Joes consisted of a team of four professional athletes, distinguished by their uniform color on the show. Unlike the first season, returning teams wore different colored uniforms upon their return. Like the previous season, the teams on the season opener and finale wore red and orange uniforms respectively. The Season Two winner was US Army Veteran SGT Jay McKeown.

Red Team
Jose Canseco, MLB
Randy Couture, Mixed Martial Arts
Michael Irvin, NFL
Kevin Willis, NBA

Purple Team
Will Clark, MLB
Tim Hardaway, NBA
Claude Lemieux, NHL
Kordell Stewart, NFL

Green Team - Winner - Rodeny Williams
Vince Coleman, MLB
Eric Dickerson, NFL
Roy Jones Jr., Boxing
Kevin Willis, NBA

Teal/Gold Team
Cobi Jones, MLS
Andre Reed, NFL
Darryl Strawberry, MLB
Spud Webb, NBA

Blue Team / Burgundy Team - Winner - Jackson Wright
Rob Dibble, MLB
Andre Rison, NFL
Robby Ginepri, pro tennis ATP
Rik Smits, NBA

Yellow Team
Kordell Stewart, NFL
Will Clark, MLB
Grant Fuhr, NHL
Tom Chambers, NBA

Light Blue Team (The New Yorkers)
Wade Boggs, MLB
Mark Jackson, NBA
John Starks, NBA
Dave Winfield, MLB

Orange "Allstar" Team (Finale)
Winner - Jay McKeown
Randall Cunningham, NFL
Tim Hardaway, NBA
Kevin Willis, NBA
Bruce Smith, NFL
Roy Jones Jr., pro Boxing
Randy Couture, Mixed Martial Arts

Season Three
For Season Three, the format was changed to a "Last Man Standing" format, akin to the NCAA Division I men's basketball tournament with regionals held at the now demolished Orange Bowl Stadium in Miami, Florida, RFK Stadium in Washington, DC, the Louisiana Superdome in New Orleans and the Rose Bowl in Pasadena, California, where the finals were also held.  The format now featured eight "Joes" in the opening round that tests them in a contest that will eliminate two of the Joes from contest.  Those six remaining Joes were then ranked from one through six with the top seed taking on number six, number two against number five and number three against number four in a home sport of one of the pros, with the top two seeds choosing from the three pros.  The winners advance to overtime, but now includes a bench where the Joes change from one uniform into another.  Again the fastest among the three advanced to the finals. Gabriel Canape, a wireless rep from Lebanon, Missouri, was the winner.

As in past seasons, the pros are designated by the color of their uniforms.

Green Team (South Regional I)
Jimmy Smith, football
Kurt Angle,  Olympic and Pro Wrestling (TNA)
Kendall Gill, basketball

Sudden death: Wrestling battle royal

Joes: Eddie Dubose, Brent Allen, Jason Vogel, Matt Hill, Dallas Robinson, Steve Huff

Winner: Jason Vogel

Purple Team (Northeast Regional I)
Ricky Williams, football
Arturo Gatti, boxing
Charles Oakley, basketball

sudden death: Punt Return for TD

Joe: "Iron" Mike Hall, Robert Foster, Mark Rohling, Donnie Frazier, Faheem Hammett, and Kevin Witt

Winner: Donnie Frazier (Hall gave it to him)

Light Blue Team (Central Regional I)
Kenny Anderson, basketball
Joe Carter, baseball
Raghib Ismail, football

Sudden Death: rebounding

Joes: Jay Williams, Micheal Martin, Chris Rich, Tony Railing, Derek Schafer, Will Hunter

Winner: Derek Schafer

Red Team (Northeast Regional II)
Jessie Armstead, football
Derrick Coleman, basketball
Marty McSorley, ice hockey

Sudden Death: onside kicks

Joes: Mike Kotsch, Pablo Healing, Rahul Soni, Jermaine Reid, Joe Goodwin, John Grkovic

Winner: Joe Goodwin

Dark Green Team (West Regional I)
Warren Moon, football
Nick Van Exel, basketball
Al Leiter, baseball

Sudden Death: TD Returns

Joes: Terrius Moseby, Dave Hubert, Dan Falkner, Jerry Lehman, Carvel Gardner, David Ortiz Jr

Winner: David Ortiz Jr

Royal Blue Team (South Regional II)
Christian Okoye, football
Paul Coffey, ice hockey
Dan Majerle, basketball

Sudden Death: scoop and score

Joes: Clayton Monte, Greg Macaluso, Brian Peters, Mark Kilibarda, Art Miller, Devon Tilly

Winner: Clayton Monte

Yellow Team (West Regional II)
John Randle, football
John Franco, baseball
Mitch Richmond, basketball

Sudden Death: intercept the ball

Joes: Dion Santo, Clarence Chaney, Adam Wasserman, Justin Simonsen, Micheal Stange, Trent Madsen

Winner: Trent Madsen

Gold Team (Central Regional II)
Brady Anderson, baseball
Sean Elliott, basketball
Jeff George, football

Sudden Death: strip the dummy

Joes: Red Simmons, Gabriel Canape, Cory Driggs, Cakvin Lafiton, Tim Fritz, Kirby Sykes

Winner: Gabriel Canape

Purple Team (Semi-Final)
Rod Woodson, football
Antonio Davis, basketball
Pernell Whitaker, boxing

Maroon Team (Finals)
Jamal Anderson, football
Allan Houston, basketball
Bob Sapp, MMA/ football

Season Four: Pros vs. Joes: All Stars
For the fourth season, which premiered April 27, 2009 at 11 pm ET/PT, the new hosts are FOX Sports NFL Sunday regulars Michael Strahan and Jay Glazer, and is titled "Pros vs. Joes All Stars". In addition, the format changed to a 3-on-3 competition between teams made up of three pros and three joes in three separate skill events and an end game between the teams.  If the Joes beat the Pros, they get $10,000.

Basketball I
Shawn Kemp
Eddie Jones
Ron Harper

Football I
Steve McNair
Tim Brown
Simeon Rice

Basketball II
Antoine Walker
Alonzo Mourning
Robert Horry

Football II
Steve McNair
Adam "Pacman" Jones
Priest Holmes

References

External links
 
 

2006 American television series debuts
2010 American television series endings
2000s American reality television series
2010s American reality television series
2000s American game shows
2010s American game shows
Sports entertainment